Ürümqi South railway station (USY: Үрүмчи Җәнувий Векити) is a railway station of the Lanzhou–Xinjiang, Northern Xinjiang and the Second Ürümqi–Jinghe railways. The station is located in Ürümqi, Xinjiang Uyghur Autonomous Region, China. The name of the station was Ürümqi railway station from 1962 until September 1, 2014. This name is now assigned to the newly built high-speed railway station of the Lanzhou–Ürümqi High-Speed Railway.

History
The station was constructed in 1962. On May 18, 2002 that station was demolished to make way for construction of the current station which was opened on April 25, 2004.

On 30 April 2014, a terrorist attack occurred at the station, which left three people dead and 79 injured.

See also
Ürümqi railway station
Alashankou railway station
Kashgar railway station
Southern Xinjiang railway

References

Railway stations in Xinjiang
Railway stations in China opened in 1962
Buildings and structures in Ürümqi
Stations on the Beijiang Railway
Stations on the Lanzhou-Xinjiang Railway
Stations on the Northern Xinjiang Railway
Railway Station, South